Old West Baltimore Historic District is a national historic district in Baltimore, Maryland, United States. It is primarily a row house neighborhood of approximately 175 city blocks directly northwest of downtown Baltimore. The district includes other housing from grand mansions to alley houses, as well as churches, public buildings (primarily schools), commercial buildings, and landscaped squares. Pennsylvania Avenue, the main street of the community, features a later 20th century municipal market house. Within the district are civic monuments that relate to Baltimore's premier historic African-American community. Such noteworthy figures as Supreme Court Justice Thurgood Marshall, Congressman Parren Mitchell, jazz artist Cab Calloway, civil rights leader Lillie Mae Carroll Jackson, and Carl Murphy, editor of the Baltimore Afro-American newspaper, lived and / or worked in the area.

Old West Baltimore Historic District was added to the National Register of Historic Places in 2004.

References

External links
, including photo from 2004, at Maryland Historical Trust
Boundary Map of the Old West Baltimore Historic District, Baltimore City, at Maryland Historical Trust

African-American history in Baltimore
Historic districts on the National Register of Historic Places in Baltimore
Greek Revival architecture in Maryland
Victorian architecture in Maryland